Markos Khatzikyriakakis (born 2 April 1974) is a Greek snowboarder. He competed in the men's giant slalom event at the 1998 Winter Olympics.

References

1974 births
Living people
Greek male snowboarders
Olympic snowboarders of Greece
Snowboarders at the 1998 Winter Olympics
Sportspeople from Attica